

Peerage of England

|rowspan="2"|Duke of Cornwall (1337)||Henry Frederick Stuart||1603||1612||Died, and his peerage dignities lapsed to the Crown
|-
|Prince Charles||1612||1625||1st Duke of York
|-
|Duke of York (1605)||Charles Stuart||1605||1625||Duke of Cornwall since 1612, see above
|-
|Marquess of Winchester (1551)||William Paulet, 4th Marquess of Winchester||1598||1628||
|-
|Marquess of Buckingham (16181)||George Villiers, 1st Marquess of Buckingham||1618||1628||New creation; Earl of Buckingham in 1617; Viscount Villiers in 1616
|-
|Earl of Arundel (1138)||Thomas Howard, 21st Earl of Arundel||1604||1646||
|-
|Earl of Oxford (1142)||Henry de Vere, 18th Earl of Oxford||1604||1625||
|-
|rowspan="3"|Earl of Shrewsbury (1442)||Gilbert Talbot, 7th Earl of Shrewsbury||1590||1616||Died
|-
|Edward Talbot, 8th Earl of Shrewsbury||1616||1617||Died
|-
|George Talbot, 9th Earl of Shrewsbury||1617||1630||
|-
|rowspan="2"|Earl of Kent (1465)||Henry Grey, 6th Earl of Kent||1573||1615||Died
|-
|Charles Grey, 7th Earl of Kent||1615||1623||
|-
|Earl of Derby (1485)||William Stanley, 6th Earl of Derby||1594||1642||
|-
|Earl of Worcester (1514)||Edward Somerset, 4th Earl of Worcester||1589||1628||
|-
|Earl of Cumberland (1525)||Francis Clifford, 4th Earl of Cumberland||1605||1641||
|-
|rowspan="2"|Earl of Rutland (1525)||Roger Manners, 5th Earl of Rutland||1588||1612||Died
|-
|Francis Manners, 6th Earl of Rutland||1612||1632||
|-
|Earl of Huntington (1529)||Henry Hastings, 5th Earl of Huntingdon||1604||1643||
|-
|Earl of Sussex (1529)||Robert Radclyffe, 5th Earl of Sussex||1593||1629||
|-
|Earl of Bath (1536)||William Bourchier, 3rd Earl of Bath||1561||1623||
|-
|Earl of Southampton (1547)||Henry Wriothesley, 3rd Earl of Southampton||1581||1624||
|-
|Earl of Bedford (1550)||Edward Russell, 3rd Earl of Bedford||1585||1627||
|-
|Earl of Pembroke (1551)||William Herbert, 3rd Earl of Pembroke||1601||1630||
|-
|Earl of Devon (1553)||William Courtenay, de jure 3rd Earl of Devon||1557||1630||
|-
|Earl of Northumberland (1557)||Henry Percy, 9th Earl of Northumberland||1585||1632||
|-
|Earl of Hertford (1559)||Edward Seymour, 1st Earl of Hertford||1559||1621||
|-
|Earl of Essex (1572)||Robert Devereux, 3rd Earl of Essex||1604||1646||
|-
|rowspan="3"|Earl of Lincoln (1572)||Henry Clinton, 2nd Earl of Lincoln||1585||1616||Died
|-
|Thomas Clinton, 3rd Earl of Lincoln||1616||1619||Died
|-
|Theophilus Clinton, 4th Earl of Lincoln||1619||1667||
|-
|Earl of Nottingham (1596)||Charles Howard, 1st Earl of Nottingham||1596||1624||
|-
|Earl of Suffolk (1603)||Thomas Howard, 1st Earl of Suffolk||1603||1626||
|-
|Earl of Dorset (1604)||Richard Sackville, 3rd Earl of Dorset||1609||1624||
|-
|Earl of Northampton (1604)||Henry Howard, 1st Earl of Northampton||1604||1614||Died, title extinct
|-
|Earl of Exeter (1605)||Thomas Cecil, 1st Earl of Exeter||1605||1623||
|-
|Earl of Montgomery (1605)||Philip Herbert, 1st Earl of Montgomery||1605||1649||
|-
|rowspan="2"|Earl of Salisbury (1605)||Robert Cecil, 1st Earl of Salisbury||1605||1612||Died
|-
|William Cecil, 2nd Earl of Salisbury||1612||1668||
|-
|Earl of Richmond (1613)||Ludovic Stewart, 1st Earl of Richmond||1613||1624||New creation
|-
|Earl of Somerset (1613)||Robert Carr, 1st Earl of Somerset||1613||1645||New creation; Viscount Rochester in 1611
|-
|Earl of Bridgewater (1617)||John Egerton, 1st Earl of Bridgewater||1617||1649||New creation
|-
|Countess of Buckingham (1618)||Mary Villiers, Countess of Buckingham||1618||1632||New creation, for life only
|-
|Earl of Northampton (1618)||William Compton, 1st Earl of Northampton||1618||1630||New creation
|-
|Earl of Leicester (1618)||Robert Sidney, 1st Earl of Leicester||1618||1626||New creation
|-
|rowspan="2"|Earl of Warwick (1618)||Robert Rich, 1st Earl of Warwick||1618||1618||New creation
|-
|Robert Rich, 2nd Earl of Warwick||1618||1658||
|-
|Earl of Devonshire (1618)||William Cavendish, 1st Earl of Devonshire||1618||1626||New creation
|-
|Earl of March (1619)||Esmé Stewart, 1st Earl of March||1619||1624||New creation
|-
|Earl of Cambridge (1619)||James Hamilton, 1st Earl of Cambridge||1619||1625||New creation, also Marquess of Hamilton in the Peerage of Scotland
|-
|Viscount Montagu (1554)||Anthony-Maria Browne, 2nd Viscount Montagu||1592||1629||
|-
|Viscount Howard of Bindon (1559)||Thomas Howard, 3rd Viscount Howard of Bindon||1590||1611||Died, title extinct
|-
|Viscount Lisle (1605)||Robert Sidney, 1st Viscount Lisle||1605||1626||Created Earl of Leicester, see above
|-
|rowspan="2"|Viscount Brackley (1616)||Thomas Egerton, 1st Viscount Brackley||1616||1617||New creation, died
|-
|John Egerton, 2nd Viscount Brackley||1617||1649||Created Earl of Bridgewater, see above
|-
|Viscount Wallingford (1616)||William Knollys, 1st Viscount Wallingford||1616||1632||New creation
|-
|Viscount Doncaster (1618)||James Hay, 1st Viscount Doncaster||1618||1636||New creation
|-
|Viscount Purbeck (1618)||John Villiers, 1st Viscount Purbeck||1619||1657||New creation
|-
|Baron de Ros (1264)||William Cecil, 17th Baron de Ros||1591||1618||Title succeeded by the Earl of Rutland, see above
|-
|Baron le Despencer (1264)||Mary Fane, 3rd Baroness le Despenser||1604||1626||
|-
|Baron de Clifford (1299)||Anne Clifford, 14th Baroness de Clifford||1605||1676||
|- 
|rowspan="2"|Baron Morley (1299)||Edward Parker, 12th Baron Morley||1577||1618||Died
|- 
|William Parker, 13th Baron Morley||1618||1622||
|- 
|Baron Zouche of Haryngworth (1308)||Edward la Zouche, 11th Baron Zouche||1569||1625||
|- 
|Baron Audley of Heleigh (1313)||George Tuchet, 11th Baron Audley||1563||1617||Created Earl of Castlehaven, in the Peerage of Ireland; barony held by his heirs until 1777, when Earldom became extinct, and Barony passed to a nephew and heir
|- 
|Baron Willoughby de Eresby (1313)||Robert Bertie, 14th Baron Willoughby de Eresby||1601||1640||
|- 
|rowspan="3"|Baron Dacre (1321)||Margaret Fiennes, 11th Baroness Dacre||1594||1612||Died
|- 
|Henry Lennard, 12th Baron Dacre||1612||1616||Died
|- 
|Richard Lennard, 13th Baron Dacre||1616||1630||
|- 
|Baron Scrope of Bolton (1371)||Emanuel Scrope, 11th Baron Scrope of Bolton||1609||1630||
|- 
|rowspan="2"|Baron Berkeley (1421)||Henry Berkeley, 7th Baron Berkeley||1534||1613||Died
|- 
|George Berkeley, 8th Baron Berkeley||1613||1658||
|- 
|Baron Dudley (1440)||Edward Sutton, 5th Baron Dudley||1586||1643||
|- 
|rowspan="2"|Baron Saye and Sele (1447)||Richard Fiennes, 7th Baron Saye and Sele||1573||1613||Died
|- 
|William Fiennes, 8th Baron Saye and Sele||1613||1662||
|- 
|Baron Stourton (1448)||Edward Stourton, 10th Baron Stourton||1588||1633||
|- 
|Baron Willoughby de Broke (1491)||Fulke Greville, 5th Baron Willoughby de Broke||1606||1628||
|- 
|Baron Monteagle (1514)||William Parker, 4th Baron Monteagle||1581||1622||
|-
|Baron Vaux of Harrowden (1523)||Edward Vaux, 4th Baron Vaux of Harrowden||1595||1661||
|-
|Baron Sandys of the Vine (1529)||William Sandys, 3rd Baron Sandys||1560||1623||
|-
|Baron Windsor (1529)||Thomas Windsor, 6th Baron Windsor||1605||1642||
|-
|Baron Wentworth (1529)||Thomas Wentworth, 4th Baron Wentworth||1593||1667||
|-
|Baron Mordaunt (1532)||John Mordaunt, 5th Baron Mordaunt||1601||1644||
|-
|Baron Cromwell (1540)||Thomas Cromwell, 4th Baron Cromwell||1607||1653||
|-
|rowspan="2"|Baron Eure (1544)||Ralph Eure, 3rd Baron Eure||1594||1617||Died
|-
|William Eure, 4th Baron Eure||1617||1646||
|-
|Baron Wharton (1545)||Philip Wharton, 3rd Baron Wharton||1572||1625||
|-
|Baron Sheffield (1547)||Edmund Sheffield, 3rd Baron Sheffield||1568||1646||
|-
|Baron Rich (1547)||Robert Rich, 3rd Baron Rich||1581||1618||Created Earl of Warwick in 1618, see above
|-
|rowspan="4"|Baron Willoughby of Parham (1547)||Charles Willoughby, 2nd Baron Willoughby of Parham||1570||1612||Died
|-
|William Willoughby, 3rd Baron Willoughby of Parham||1612||1617||Died
|-
|Henry Willoughby, 4th Baron Willoughby of Parham||1617||1618||Died
|-
|Francis Willoughby, 5th Baron Willoughby of Parham||1618||1666||
|-
|Baron Darcy of Aston (1548)||John Darcy, 3rd Baron Darcy of Aston||1602||1635||
|-
|Baron Darcy of Chiche (1551)||Thomas Darcy, 3rd Baron Darcy of Chiche||1581||1640||
|-
|Baron Paget (1552)||William Paget, 4th Baron Paget||1604||1629||
|-
|Baron North (1554)||Dudley North, 3rd Baron North||1600||1666||
|-
|Baron Chandos (1554)||Grey Brydges, 5th Baron Chandos||1602||1621||
|-
|rowspan="2"|Baron Hunsdon (1559)||John Carey, 3rd Baron Hunsdon||1603||1617||Died
|-
|Henry Carey, 4th Baron Hunsdon||1617||1666||
|-
|rowspan="2"|Baron St John of Bletso (1559)||Oliver St John, 3rd Baron St John of Bletso||1596||1618||Died
|-
|Oliver St John, 4th Baron St John of Bletso||1618||1646||
|-
|rowspan="2"|Baron De La Warr (1570)||Thomas West, 3rd Baron De La Warr||1602||1618||Died
|-
|Henry West, 4th Baron De La Warr||1618||1628||
|-
|Baron Compton (1572)||William Compton, 2nd Baron Compton||1589||1630||Created Earl of Northampton, see above
|-
|Baron Norreys (1572)||Francis Norris, 2nd Baron Norreys||1601||1622||
|-
|Baron Knollys (1603)||William Knollys, 1st Baron Knollys||1603||1632||Created Viscount Wallingford, see above
|-
|Baron (A)bergavenny (1604)||Edward Nevill, 1st Baron Bergavenny||1604||1622||
|-
|Baron Danvers (1603)||Henry Danvers, 1st Baron Danvers||1603||1644||
|-
|Baron Ellesmere (1603)||Thomas Egerton, 1st Baron Ellesmere||1603||1617||Created Viscount Brackley, see above
|-
|rowspan="2"|Baron Gerard (1603)||Thomas Gerard, 1st Baron Gerard||1603||1617||Died
|-
|Gilbert Gerard, 2nd Baron Gerard||1617||1622||
|-
|rowspan="2"|Baron Grey of Groby (1603)||Henry Grey, 1st Baron Grey of Groby||1603||1614||Died
|-
|Henry Grey, 2nd Baron Grey of Groby||1614||1673||
|-
|rowspan="2"|Baron Harington of Exton (1603)||John Harington, 1st Baron Harington of Exton||1603||1613||Died
|-
|John Harington, 2nd Baron Harington of Exton||1613||1614||Died, title extinct
|-
|rowspan="2"|Baron Petre (1603)||John Petre, 1st Baron Petre||1603||1613||Died
|-
|William Petre, 2nd Baron Petre||1613||1637||
|-
|rowspan="2"|Baron Russell of Thornhaugh (1603)||William Russell, 1st Baron Russell of Thornhaugh||1603||1613||Died
|-
|Francis Russell, 2nd Baron Russell of Thornhaugh||1613||1641||
|-
|Baron Spencer (1603)||Robert Spencer, 1st Baron Spencer of Wormleighton||1603||1627||
|-
|Baron Wotton (1603)||Edward Wotton, 1st Baron Wotton||1603||1628||
|-
|Baron Denny (1604)||Edward Denny, 1st Baron Denny||1604||1630||
|-
|Baron Arundell of Wardour (1605)||Thomas Arundell, 1st Baron Arundell of Wardour||1605||1639||
|-
|Baron Carew (1605)||George Carew, 1st Baron Carew||1605||1629||
|-
|Baron Cavendish of Hardwick (1605)||William Cavendish, 1st Baron Cavendish of Hardwick||1605||1626||Created Earl of Devonshire, see above
|-
|Baron Stanhope of Harrington (1605)||John Stanhope, 1st Baron Stanhope||1605||1621||
|-
|Baron Hay (1606)||James Hay, 1st Baron Hay||1606||1636||Created Viscount Doncaster, see above
|-
|Baron Knyvett (1607)||Thomas Knyvet, 1st Baron Knyvet||1607||1622||
|-
|rowspan="2"|Baron Clifton (1608)||Gervase Clifton, 1st Baron Clifton||1608||1618||Died
|-
|Katherine Clifton, 2nd Baroness Clifton||1618||1637||
|-
|rowspan="2"|Baron Dormer (1615)||Robert Dormer, 1st Baron Dormer||1615||1616||New creation, died
|-
|Robert Dormer, 2nd Baron Dormer||1616||1643||
|-
|rowspan="2"|Baron Teynham (1616)||John Roper, 1st Baron Teynham||1616||1618||New creation, died
|-
|Christopher Roper, 2nd Baron Teynham||1618||1622||
|-
|Baron Houghton (1616)||John Holles, 1st Baron Houghton||1616||1637||New creation
|-
|Baron Stanhope of Shelford (1616)||Philip Stanhope, 1st Baron Stanhope of Shelford||1616||1656||New creation
|-
|Baron Noel (1617)||Edward Noel, 1st Baron Noel||1617||1643||New creation
|-
|Baron Verulam (1618)||Francis Bacon, 1st Baron Verulam||1618||1626||New creation
|-
|Baron Digby (1618)||John Digby, 1st Baron Digby||1618||1653||New creation
|-
|}

Peerage of Scotland

|rowspan=2|Duke of Rothesay (1398)||Henry Frederick Stuart, Duke of Rothesay||1594||1612||Died
|-
|Charles Stuart, Duke of Rothesay||1612||1625||
|-
|Duke of Lennox (1581)||Ludovic Stewart, 2nd Duke of Lennox||1583||1624||
|-
|Duke of Albany (1600)||Charles Stuart, 1st Duke of Albany||1600||1625||Succeeded as Duke of Rothesay, see above
|-
|Marquess of Huntly (1599)||George Gordon, 1st Marquess of Huntly||1599||1636||
|-
|Marquess of Hamilton (1599)||James Hamilton, 2nd Marquess of Hamilton||1604||1625||
|-
|rowspan=2|Earl of Angus (1389)||William Douglas, 10th Earl of Angus||1591||1611||Died
|-
|William Douglas, 11th Earl of Angus||1611||1660||
|-
|Earl of Argyll (1457)||Archibald Campbell, 7th Earl of Argyll||1584||1638||
|-
|Earl of Crawford (1398)||David Lindsay, 12th Earl of Crawford||1607||1620||
|-
|Earl of Erroll (1452)||Francis Hay, 9th Earl of Erroll||1585||1631||
|-
|Earl Marischal (1458)||George Keith, 5th Earl Marischal||1581||1623||
|-
|rowspan=2|Earl of Sutherland (1235)||John Gordon, 13th Earl of Sutherland||1594||1615||Died
|-
|John Gordon, 14th Earl of Sutherland||1615||1679||
|-
|Earl of Mar (1114)||John Erskine, 19th//2nd Earl of Mar||1572||1634||
|-
|rowspan=2|Earl of Rothes (1458)||Andrew Leslie, 5th Earl of Rothes||1558||1611||Died
|-
|John Leslie, 6th Earl of Rothes||1611||1641||
|-
|Earl of Morton (1458)||William Douglas, 7th Earl of Morton||1606||1648||
|-
|Earl of Menteith (1427)||William Graham, 7th Earl of Menteith||1598||1661||
|-
|Earl of Glencairn (1488)||James Cunningham, 7th Earl of Glencairn||1578||1630||
|-
|rowspan=2|Earl of Eglinton (1507)||Hugh Montgomerie, 5th Earl of Eglinton||1586||1612||Died
|-
|Alexander Montgomerie, 6th Earl of Eglinton||1612||1661||
|-
|Earl of Montrose (1503)||John Graham, 4th Earl of Montrose||1608||1626||
|-
|rowspan=2|Earl of Cassilis (1509)||John Kennedy, 5th Earl of Cassilis||1576||1615||Died
|-
|John Kennedy, 6th Earl of Cassilis||1615||1668||
|-
|Earl of Caithness (1455)||George Sinclair, 5th Earl of Caithness||1582||1643||
|-
|Earl of Buchan (1469)||Mary Douglas, 6th Countess of Buchan||1601||1628||
|-
|Earl of Moray (1562)||James Stuart, 3rd Earl of Moray||1591||1638||
|-
|Earl of Orkney (1581)||Patrick Stewart, 2nd Earl of Orkney||1593||1614||Title forfeited
|-
|Earl of Atholl (1596)||James Stewart, 2nd Earl of Atholl||1603||1625||
|-
|Earl of Linlithgow (1600)||Alexander Livingstone, 1st Earl of Linlithgow||1600||1621||
|-
|Earl of Winton (1600)||George Seton, 3rd Earl of Winton||1607||1650||
|-
|rowspan=2|Earl of Home (1605)||Alexander Home, 1st Earl of Home||1605||1619||Died
|-
|James Home, 2nd Earl of Home||1619||1633||
|-
|rowspan=2|Earl of Perth (1605)||James Drummond, 1st Earl of Perth||1605||1611||Died
|-
|John Drummond, 2nd Earl of Perth||1611||1662||
|-
|Earl of Dunfermline (1605)||Alexander Seton, 1st Earl of Dunfermline||1605||1622||
|-
|Earl of Dunbar (1605)||George Home, 1st Earl of Dunbar||1605||1611||Died, title dormant
|-
|rowspan=2|Earl of Wigtown (1606)||John Fleming, 1st Earl of Wigtown||1606||1619||Died
|-
|John Fleming, 2nd Earl of Wigtown||1619||1650||
|-
|rowspan=2|Earl of Abercorn (1606)||James Hamilton, 1st Earl of Abercorn||1606||1618||Died
|-
|James Hamilton, 2nd Earl of Abercorn||1618||1670||
|-
|rowspan=2|Earl of Kinghorne (1606)||Patrick Lyon, 1st Earl of Kinghorne||1606||1615||Died
|-
|John Lyon, 2nd Earl of Kinghorne||1615||1646||
|-
|Earl of Lothian (1606)||Robert Kerr, 2nd Earl of Lothian||1609||1624||
|-
|Earl of Tullibardine (1606)||William Murray, 2nd Earl of Tullibardine||1609||1626||
|-
|Earl of Roxburghe (1616)||Robert Ker, 1st Earl of Roxburghe||1616||1650||New creation
|-
|Earl of Kellie (1619)||Thomas Erskine, 1st Earl of Kellie||1619||1639||New creation
|-
|Earl of Buccleuch (1619)||Walter Scott, 1st Earl of Buccleuch||1619||1633||New creation
|-
|Earl of Haddington (1619)||Thomas Hamilton, 1st Earl of Haddington||1619||1637||New creation, also created Lord Binning in 1613
|-
|Viscount of Fentoun (1606)||Thomas Erskine, 1st Viscount of Fentoun||1606||1639||Created Earl of Kellie, see above
|-
|Viscount of Haddington (1606)||John Ramsay, 1st Viscount of Haddington||1606||1626||
|-
|Viscount of Lauderdale (1616)||John Maitland, 1st Viscount of Lauderdale||1616||1645||New creation
|-
|rowspan=2|Lord Somerville (1430)||Gilbert Somerville, 8th Lord Somerville||1597||1618||Died
|-
|Hugh Somerville, 9th Lord Somerville||1618||1640||
|-
|Lord Forbes (1442)||Arthur Forbes, 9th Lord Forbes||1606||1641||
|-
|rowspan=2|Lord Maxwell (1445)||John Maxwell, 9th Lord Maxwell||1593||1613||Died
|-
|Robert Maxwell, 10th Lord Maxwell||1613||1646||
|-
|rowspan=2|Lord Lindsay of the Byres (1445)||Robert Lindsay, 9th Lord Lindsay||1609||1619||Died
|-
|John Lindsay, 10th Lord Lindsay||1619||1678||
|-
|rowspan=2|Lord Saltoun (1445)||John Abernethy, 8th Lord Saltoun||1590||1612||Died
|-
|Alexander Abernethy, 9th Lord Saltoun||1612||1668||
|-
|rowspan=2|Lord Gray (1445)||Patrick Gray, 6th Lord Gray||1608||1611||Died
|-
|Andrew Gray, 7th Lord Gray||1611||1663||
|-
|rowspan=2|Lord Sinclair (1449)||Patrick Sinclair, 8th Lord Sinclair||1607||1615||Died
|-
|John Sinclair, 9th Lord Sinclair||1615||1676||
|-
|Lord Borthwick (1452)||John Borthwick, 8th Lord Borthwick||1599||1623||
|-
|rowspan=2|Lord Boyd (1454)||Thomas Boyd, 6th Lord Boyd||1590||1611||Died
|-
|Robert Boyd, 7th Lord Boyd||1611||1628||
|-
|Lord Oliphant (1455)||Laurence Oliphant, 5th Lord Oliphant||1593||1631||
|-
|rowspan=2|Lord Cathcart (1460)||Alan Cathcart, 4th Lord Cathcart||1547||1618||Died
|-
|Alan Cathcart, 5th Lord Cathcart||1618||1628||
|-
|Lord Lovat (1464)||Simon Fraser, 6th Lord Lovat||1577||1633||
|-
|Lord Carlyle of Torthorwald (1473)||James Douglas, 6th Lord Carlyle||1605||1638||
|-
|rowspan=2|Lord Crichton of Sanquhar (1488)||Robert Crichton, 8th Lord Crichton of Sanquhar||1569||1612||Died
|-
|William Crichton, 9th Lord Crichton of Sanquhar||1612||1643||
|-
|Lord Hay of Yester (1488)||John Hay, 8th Lord Hay of Yester||1609||1653||
|-
|rowspan=2|Lord Sempill (1489)||Robert Sempill, 4th Lord Sempill||1576||1611||Died
|-
|Hugh Sempill, 5th Lord Sempill||1611||1639||
|-
|Lord Herries of Terregles (1490)||John Maxwell, 6th Lord Herries of Terregles||1604||1631||
|-
|rowspan=2|Lord Ogilvy of Airlie (1491)||James Ogilvy, 6th Lord Ogilvy of Airlie||1606||1617||Died
|-
|James Ogilvy, 7th Lord Ogilvy of Airlie||1617||1665||
|-
|Lord Ross (1499)||James Ross, 6th Lord Ross||1595||1633||
|-
|Lord Elphinstone (1509)||Alexander, 4th Lord Elphinstone||1602||1638||
|-
|rowspan=2|Lord Ochiltree (1543)||Andrew Stuart, 3rd Lord Ochiltree||1591||1615||Resigned the Lordship
|-
|James Stewart, 4th Lord Ochiltree||1615||1658||
|-
|rowspan=2|Lord Torphichen (1564)||James Sandilands, 2nd Lord Torphichen||1579||1617||Died
|-
|James Sandilands, 3rd Lord Torphichen||1617||1622||
|-
|Lord Paisley (1587)||Claud Hamilton, 1st Lord Paisley||1587||1621||
|-
|Lord Maitland (1590)||John Maitland, 2nd Lord Maitland of Thirlestane||1595||1645||Created Viscount Lauderdale, see above
|-
|Lord Spynie (1590)||Alexander Lindsay, 2nd Lord Spynie||1607||1646||
|-
|Lord Roxburghe (1600)||Robert Ker, 1st Lord Roxburghe||1600||1650||Created Earl of Roxburghe, see above
|-
|Lord Lindores (1600)||Patrick Leslie, 2nd Lord Lindores||1608||1649||
|-
|rowspan=2|Lord Campbell of Loudoun (1601)||Hugh Campbell, 1st Lord Campbell of Loudoun||1601||1619||Resigned
|-
|John Campbell, 2nd Lord Campbell of Loudoun||1619||1662||
|-
|rowspan=3|Lord Kinloss (1602)||Edward Bruce, 1st Lord Kinloss||1602||1611||Died
|-
|Edward Bruce, 2nd Lord Kinloss||1611||1613||Died
|-
|Thomas Bruce, 3rd Lord Kinloss||1613||1663||
|-
|Lord Colville of Culross (1604)||James Colville, 1st Lord Colville of Culross||1604||1629||
|-
|Lord Scone (1605)||David Murray, 1st Lord Scone||1605||1631||
|-
|rowspan=2|Lord Balmerinoch (1606)||James Elphinstone, 1st Lord Balmerinoch||1606||1612||Died
|-
|John Elphinstone, 2nd Lord Balmerino||1612||1649||
|-
|rowspan=2|Lord Blantyre (1606)||Walter Stewart, 1st Lord Blantyre||1606||1617||Died
|-
|William Stewart, 2nd Lord Blantyre||1617||1638||
|-
|rowspan=2|Lord Scott of Buccleuch (1606)||Walter Scott, 1st Lord Scott of Buccleuch||1606||1611||Died
|-
|Walter Scott, 2nd Lord Scott of Buccleuch||1611||1633||Created Earl of Buccleuch in 1619, see above
|-
|Lord Coupar (1607)||James Elphinstone, 1st Lord Coupar||1607||1669||
|-
|Lord Holyroodhouse (1607)||John Bothwell, 2nd Lord Holyroodhouse||1609||1638||
|-
|Lord Garlies (1607)||Alexander Stewart, 1st Lord Garlies||1607||1649||
|-
|rowspan=2|Lord Balfour of Burleigh (1607)||Michael Balfour, 1st Lord Balfour of Burleigh||1607||1619||Died
|-
|Robert Balfour, 2nd Lord Balfour of Burleigh||1619||1663||
|-
|Lord Cranstoun (1609)||William Cranstoun, 1st Lord Cranstoun||1609||1627||
|-
|rowspan=2|Lord Mackenzie of Kintail (1609)||Kenneth Mackenzie, 1st Lord Mackenzie of Kintail||1609||1611||Died
|-
|Colin Mackenzie, 2nd Lord Mackenzie of Kintail||1611||1633||
|-
|Lord Pittenweem (1609)||Frederick Stewart, 1st Lord Pittenweem||1609||1625||
|-
|Lord Maderty (1609)||James Drummond, 1st Lord Madderty||1609||1623||
|-
|Lord Dingwall (1609)||Richard Preston, 1st Lord Dingwall||1609||1628||
|-
|rowspan=2|Lord Saint Colme (1611)||Henry Stewart, 1st Lord Saint Colme||1611||1612||New creation, died
|-
|James Stewart, 2nd Lord Saint Colme||1612||1620||
|-
|Lord Ogilvy of Deskford (1616)||Walter Ogilvy, 1st Lord Ogilvy of Deskford||1616||1626||New creation
|-
|Lord Carnegie (1616)||David Carnegie, 1st Lord Carnegie||1616||1658||New creation
|-
|Lord Melville of Monymaill (1616)||Robert Melville, 1st Lord Melville||1616||1621||New creation
|-
|Lord Ramsay of Dalhousie (1618)||George Ramsay, 1st Lord Ramsay of Dalhousie||1618||Bef 1629||New creation
|-
|}

Peerage of Ireland

|rowspan=2|Earl of Kildare (1316)||Gerald FitzGerald, 14th Earl of Kildare||1599||1612||Died
|-
|Gerald FitzGerald, 15th Earl of Kildare||1612||1620||
|-
|rowspan=2|Earl of Ormond (1328)||Thomas Butler, 10th Earl of Ormond||1546||1614||Died
|-
|Walter Butler, 11th Earl of Ormond||1614||1633||
|-
|rowspan=3|Earl of Waterford (1446)||Gilbert Talbot, 7th Earl of Waterford||1590||1616||Died
|-
|Edward Talbot, 8th Earl of Waterford||1616||1617||Died
|-
|George Talbot, 9th Earl of Waterford||1617||1630||
|-
|Earl of Clanricarde (1543)||Richard Burke, 4th Earl of Clanricarde||1601||1635||
|-
|Earl of Thomond (1543)||Donogh O'Brien, 4th Earl of Thomond||1581||1624||
|-
|rowspan=2|Earl of Castlehaven (1616)||George Tuchet, 1st Earl of Castlehaven||1616||1617||New creation; died
|-
|Mervyn Tuchet, 2nd Earl of Castlehaven||1617||1630||
|-
|Earl of Desmond (1619)||Richard Preston, 1st Earl of Desmond||1619||1628||
|-
|Viscount Gormanston (1478)||Jenico Preston, 5th Viscount Gormanston||1599||1630||
|-
|rowspan=2|Viscount Buttevant (1541)||David de Barry, 5th Viscount Buttevant||1581||1617||Died
|-
|David Barry, 6th Viscount Buttevant||1617||1642||
|-
|Viscount Mountgarret (1550)||Richard Butler, 3rd Viscount Mountgarret||1602||1651||
|-
|Viscount Butler of Tulleophelim (1603)||Theobald Butler, 1st Viscount Butler of Tulleophelim||1603||1613||Died, title extinct
|-
|Viscount Powerscourt (1618)||Richard Wingfield, 1st Viscount Powerscourt||1618||1634||New creation
|-
|Viscount Dunluce (1618)||Randal MacDonnell, 1st Viscount Dunluce||1618||1636||New creation
|-
|rowspan=2|Baron Athenry (1172)||Edmond I de Bermingham||1580||1612||Died
|-
|Richard III de Bermingham||1612||1645||
|-
|Baron Kingsale (1223)||John de Courcy, 18th Baron Kingsale||1599||1628||
|-
|Baron Kerry (1223)||Thomas Fitzmaurice, 18th Baron Kerry||1600||1630||
|-
|rowspan=2|Baron Slane (1370)||William Fleming, 11th Baron Slane||1597||1612||Died
|-
|Christopher Fleming, 12th Baron Slane||1612||1625||
|-
|rowspan=2|Baron Howth (1425)||Christopher St Lawrence, 10th Baron Howth||1606||1619||Died
|-
|Nicholas St Lawrence, 11th Baron Howth||1619||1643||
|-
|rowspan=2|Baron Killeen (1449)||Christopher Plunkett, 9th Baron Killeen||1595||1613||Died
|-
|Luke Plunkett, 10th Baron Killeen||1613||1637||
|-
|Baron Trimlestown (1461)||Robert Barnewall, 7th Baron Trimlestown||1598||1639||
|-
|Baron Dunsany (1462)||Patrick Plunkett, 9th Baron of Dunsany||1603||1668||
|-
|Baron Delvin (1486)||Richard Nugent, 7th Baron Delvin||1602||1642||
|-
|Baron Power (1535)||John Power, 5th Baron Power||1607||1661||
|-
|Baron Dunboyne (1541)||James Butler, 2nd/12th Baron Dunboyne||1566||1624||
|-
|Baron Louth (1541)||Matthew Plunkett, 5th Baron Louth||1607||1629||
|-
|rowspan=2|Baron Upper Ossory (1541)||Florence Fitzpatrick, 3rd Baron Upper Ossory||1581||1613||Died
|-
|Teige Fitzpatrick, 4th Baron Upper Ossory||1613||1627||
|-
|Baron Inchiquin (1543)||Dermod O'Brien, 5th Baron Inchiquin||1597||1624||
|-
|Baron Bourke of Castleconnell (1580)||Edmund Bourke, 5th Baron Bourke of Connell||1599||1635||
|-
|Baron Cahir (1583)||Thomas Butler, 2nd Baron Cahir||1596||1627||
|-
|Baron Chichester (1613)||Arthur Chichester, 1st Baron Chichester||1613||1625||New creation
|-
|Baron Ardee (1616)||Edward Brabazon, 1st Baron Ardee||1616||1625||New creation
|-
|Baron Boyle (1616)||Richard Boyle, 1st Baron Boyle||1616||1643||New creation
|-
|Baron Moore (1616)||Garret Moore, 1st Baron Moore||1616||1627||New creation
|-
|Baron Ridgeway (1616)||Thomas Ridgeway, 1st Baron Ridgeway||1616||1631||New creation
|-
|Baron Hamilton (1617)||James Hamilton, 2nd Baron Hamilton||1617||1633||New creation
|-
|Baron Bourke of Brittas (1618)||Theobald Bourke, 1st Baron Bourke of Brittas||1618||1654||New creation
|-
|rowspan=2|Baron Lambart (1618)||Oliver Lambart, 1st Baron Lambart||1618||1618||New creation; died
|-
|Charles Lambart, 2nd Baron Lambart||1618||1660||
|-
|Baron Mountjoy (1618)||Mountjoy Blount, 1st Baron Mountjoy||1618||1665||New creation
|-
|Baron Balfour (1619)||James Balfour, 1st Baron Balfour of Glenawley||1619||1634||New creation
|-
|Baron Castle Stewart (1619)||Andrew Stuart, 1st Baron Castle Stuart||1619||1629||New creation
|-
|Baron Dillon (1619)||James Dillon, 1st Baron Dillon||1619||1642||New creation
|-
|}

References

 

1610
1610s in England
1610s in Ireland
1610s in Scotland
Peers
Peers
Peers
1610
Peers
Peers